Eriachneae is a tribe of grasses in subfamily Micrairoideae, with 50 species in two genera. Species in the tribe use the C4 photosynthetic pathway and are distributed mainly in Australasia, reaching into Asia and Micronesia.

Genera
Eriachne
Pheidochloa

References

Micrairoideae
Grasses of Asia
Grasses of Oceania
Poaceae tribes